WBUT (1050 AM) is a commercial radio station, licensed to Butler, Pennsylvania, in the northern suburbs of the Pittsburgh metropolitan area.  It is owned by St. Barnabas Broadcasting, a division of the Saint Barnabas Health System, along with its sister stations WJAS, WBVP, WMBA, WISR and WLER-FM. 

WBUT carries a Classic Country radio format, along with local news, sports and weather.  WBUT is a MRN and PRN affiliate carrying NASCAR, a Penn State Football Network affiliate, and also carries Butler Area Senior High School football and basketball games.  The studios and offices are at 252 Pillow Street.

By day, WBUT is powered at 500 watts.  But because 1050 AM is a clear channel frequency, the station must reduce power at night to only 62 watts to avoid interference.  Programming is also heard on 250 watt FM translator W247DF at 97.3 MHz.  WBUT also streams via the TuneIn app.

History
WBUT first applied for a construction permit from the Federal Communications Commission in March 1946, and had considered the frequencies of 1230, 1600, and 1430 kHz before finally settling on 1580 kHz, which was granted by the FCC in August 1948.

The station first signed on the air in 1949 and was first owned by the Wise family, which also published The Butler Eagle, Butler's daily newspaper, doing business as Eagle Printing Company.  J. Leonard Taylor served as the station's first general manager.

The station first operated from the Nixon Hotel in downtown Butler, where Morgan Center stands today.

WRYO, a radio station that debuted at 1050 kHz in 1948 in Rochester, Pennsylvania, in adjacent Beaver County, Pennsylvania, failed by 1952, leaving its  frequency available for WBUT to switch to.  Like WRYO, WBUT was powered at 250 watts as a daytimer until its current tower in Center Township was built in 1979.  WBUT began broadcasting from this new tower in 1980, and was subsequently allowed to double its power to the current value of 500 watts, but still retained its daytime-only operational status.

With the frequency swap, came its first change in ownership.  The new WBUT, along with co-owned WBUT-FM 103.9 mHz, were sold to Beacom Broadcasting Enterprises in 1953, headed by J. Patrick Beacom.  WBUT-FM was sold and the station relocated to Mercer County, Pennsylvania.

A few years later, WBUT successfully applied for another FM broadcasting license at 97.7 MHz, which coincidentally, once belonged to its competitor, WISR-AM, before it returned the license an unnecessary expense.  The call letters of the station at FM 97.7 were changed to WBUT-FM, with the two stations simulcasting.  In 1965 the Federal Communications Commission (FCC) enacted new rules, calling for AM-FM combo stations to offer unduplicated programming at least half of the broadcast day.   

The stations were purchased by Larry Berg in 1964, who did business as WBUT, Inc.  For a time during the 1960s, the studios and transmitter were located on a hill south of Downtown Butler, near the Meadowood residential plan.

  WBUT AM/FM was sold on July 14, 1978 from Larry Berg to Brandon Communications Systems, Incorporated, a company headed by Robert C. "Bob" Brandon and his brother Ronald. (Berg would later join the staff of then-competitor WISR as a sales rep and talk show host.)  However, the licensee remained under the name WBUT Inc.

Not long after acquiring the two stations, Brandon moved both from their downtown Butler location at the Nixon Hotel to a Center Township office and then across the street to a former Citizens' Bank branch north of Butler at the intersection of Route 8 (a.k.a. North Main Street Extension) and Mercer Road in Center Township.    

When the decision was made to separate the AM and FM stations, Brandon used his knowledge in broadcast engineering to construct an automation system capable of providing live-sounding programming on his FM station, now assigned the call letters WLER-FM.  WBUT and WLER would both sign on at 6 am, simulcast its morning show for two hours, break away at 8 am, and then rejoin at 7 pm before signing off at 10 pm.

Music and voice-tracked disc jockeys were provided by Concept Productions, based in Roseville, California.  Personalities like Steven Tyler, Dave Ware and Terry Nelson were all thought to be on-site announcers.  While these announcers aired on WLER, WBUT aired more local news and information intensive programming, with popular shows like "The Super Store", a buy-sell-trade program allowing listeners to sell unwanted items or find others for sale, and "Speak Up", a locally produced talk show that ran after the noon news.

WBUT and WLER welcomed a third station into the fold, longtime crosstown competitor 680 WISR, in 1997, following its sale by Butler Broadcasting, Inc.  The Brandon brothers then changed the name of their company to the Butler County Radio Network.  Within a few years, the Brandons would sell their interests, along with their partners, to its present group of four owners, who continue to do business as the Butler County Radio Network today.
A near-tragedy took place in the summer of 1990 when then-program director Shirley A. "Sam" Minehart was changing an automation tape for WLER.  The automation system was separated by a large plate-glass window from outside, that would allow Route 8 commuters to see programming at work.  A vehicle traveling on Route 8 went out of control and crashed through the window and into the automation system.  Minehart had just walked away from the system as the car crashed through the window, scattering shards of glass everywhere.

WBUT news reporter Dave Cubbison was on the air delivering a live newscast when he looked up and saw the car coming towards the building, yelling to Minehart "Oh no, there's a car coming... run!" into an open microphone.  Knowing the car was going to hit, Cubbison then ran and dove under a desk.  Cubbison and Minehart were not hurt, but the driver did sustain minor injuries.

The station switched from oldies to country music early in 2006.  Morning show host Bob Cupp has been with the station for more than 25 years.  In 2003, WBUT and WLER moved from their studio building in Center Township and joined WISR in a new facility at the Pullman Commerce Center, on the city's south side, near the village of Lyndora.  Ten years later the station moved to its current location on Pillow Street in Butler.

WBUT for many years had been a Mutual Broadcasting System network affiliate.  Upon the acquisition of Mutual by Westwood One, WBUT affiliated with co-owned CNN Radio.  This relationship continued until 2009, when WBUT changed its affiliation to CBS Radio News.

In April 2018, WBUT added an FM translator at 97.3 MHz, W247DF, allowing listeners who prefer FM radio to hear the station on that band.  In July 2022, Inside Radio reported that WBUT and its affiliate stations would be sold to Pittsburgh Radio Partners.  The sale closed shortly before Labor Day in 2022.  Less than two monts later, St. Barnabas Broadcasting, a division of St. Barnabas Health System of Gibsonia, announced that it would acquire WBUT and its affiliate stations from Pittsburgh Radio Partners.

Weekday programming
"The Breakfast Club" with Bob Cupp and Tyler Friel (Weekday mornings 5:30 am to 9 am.)

"The News at Noon" with Bob Cupp. Local news, weather and obituaries. (Monday through Friday at 12 pm)

CBS Radio News updates at the top of every hour.  Local news updates weekday mornings and afternoons.

Weekend programming
10a-12p "Z-max Racing Country" (music and NASCAR talk)

12p-12:15p - Local News at Noon

12:15p-2p "Country Hitmakers"

5p-7p "Serving Your Country"

7p-9p "The Road" ("live" country concerts)

9p-11p "Nascar USA" - (music and NASCAR talk)

Sunday: 
7:30-8:30a - (local church programming)

8:30a-10:30a "Powersource Country" - music program

10:30a-12p - (local church programming)

12p-12:15p - Local News at Noon

5p-9p- "Crook and Chase Countdown" (country music)

7p-9pm- "Classic Country Today" (country music)

Sports
Each Wednesday evening Tyler Friel hosts the Sports Soundoff program from 5-6 PM.

WBUT is a Motor Racing Network affiliate, carrying NASCAR radio broadcasts during the year. WBUT also carries a few IndyCar races, including the Indy 500.  WBUT also carries Penn State Football.

References

 FCC History Cards - WBUT
 1949 Broadcasting Yearbook
 1950 Broadcasting Yearbook
 1955 Broadcasting Yearbook
 1959 Broadcasting Yearbook
 1973 Broadcasting Yearbook
 1979 Broadcasting Yearbook
 1980 Broadcasting Yearbook
 1981 Broadcasting Yearbook

External links

Country radio stations in the United States
BUT
Radio stations established in 1949
1949 establishments in Pennsylvania